This article lists magician characters depicted on film, both real and fictional.

Real-life magicians

Fictional magicians

See also
Magic (illusion)
List of magicians